Bobrovy Dvory is a rural locality (a selo) and the administrative center of Bobrodvorskaya Territorial Administration, Gubkinsky District, Belgorod Oblast, Russia. The population was 1,332 as of 2010. There are 13 streets.

Geography 
Bobrovy Dvory is located 19 km southwest of Gubkin (the district's administrative centre) by road. Shorstovo is the nearest rural locality.

References 

Rural localities in Gubkinsky District